The Zambian Watchdog is an investigative online media platform that focusses on corruption and other major crimes such as drug trafficking in Zambia. It also contains breaking news on politics and major events in Zambia. The Zambian Watchdog was founded as a newspaper with an online edition, but was forced into exile in 2009 and subsequently closed its printed newspaper.

Journalists for the newspaper operate undercover and anonymously in Zambia, but the editors lived in exile due to threats on their lives.

Its official site and multiple linking pages to the posts have been censored inside Zambia by the government, restricting the human right of freedom of speech. After the controversial 2016 presidential elections, the Zambian Watchdog Facebook page was blocked by the Face Book citing its rules similar to the ones used to block Donald Trumps page. This was done after claims by the government that the Watchdog was inciting violence in the country through false and unprofessional reports, particularly claiming it supported the opposition UPND.

Journalists writing for the Zambian Watchdog frequently face state-sponsored persecution. Some are currently attending court trials on what human rights bodies and local media associations claim are trumped up charges in a move perceived as state retribution.

References

External links 
 Official site

Newspapers published in Zambia